Rajib Ghosh may refer to:

 Rajib Ghosh (footballer) (born 1989), Indian footballer
 Rajib Ghosh (journalist) (1962–2021), Indian journalist